Jean Michaël Seri (born 19 July 1991) is an Ivorian professional footballer who plays as a central midfielder for EFL Championship club Hull City and the Ivory Coast national team.

Club career

Early career in the Ivory Coast
In his native Ivory Coast, the young Seri was nicknamed "Galla", because he tried to emulate the former Monaco and Paris Saint-Germain midfielder Marcelo Gallardo, whose technical skills he admired. Seri joined the Ivorian football academy that was opened in 2001 by the Ivorian footballer Cyril Domoraud. "Jean is gifted, intelligent and respectful," Domoraud said in retrospect. "In his young days, he was one step ahead of the others, thanks to his ball control."
 
Born in the south-western city of Grand-Béréby, Seri began his career as a youth player with Abidjan club Africa Sports d'Abidjan in July 2007. The best clubs in Ivory Coast fought for his services. In January 2010, Seri started his career as a senior player by joining ASEC Mimosas, the most successful club in Ivorian football, where he needed just one season to prove himself and become one of the best players in the country. "He is a great listener, and his state of mind is impeccable," raved Sébastien Desabre, ASEC Mimosas's head coach from October 2010 to October 2012 when Seri was a senior player there, and that quality enabled Seri to make steady progress.

Porto
On 2 November 2012, Seri joined Primeira Liga club Porto on loan, after impressing their scouts. However, there was no place for Seri in the club's first team. He was thus forced to play for the club's reserve team, scoring once in 19 Segunda Liga matches in the first five months of 2013.

Paços de Ferreira
On 31 August 2013, two months after finishing his loan spell at Porto (the Dragões), Seri joined another Primeira Liga club Paços de Ferreira on a permanent basis and on a free transfer by signing a three-year deal. He debuted for the Pacenses on 14 September 2013 against Benfica in a Primeira Liga 3–1 away loss. On 2 March 2014, he scored a goal in the 54th minute to register his first competitive goal for Paços de Ferreira in a 3–1 Primeira Liga home win over Marítimo to send his side away from the relegation zone. It was at Paços de Ferreira where Seri's magnificent range of passing and ability to dictate the tempo of the game made him a fans' favourite. The club finished in eighth place in the 2014–15 Primeira Liga, and Ligue 1 club Nice were quick to sign Seri before bigger clubs took notice.

Nice

On 11 June 2015, Seri officially joined Ligue 1 club Nice for a transfer fee of €1 million. On 27 May 2015, prior to the opening of the transfer window, the club had announced the "very likely" arrival of Seri. On 8 August 2015, Seri made his competitive debut for Nice in their opening match of the 2015–16 Ligue 1 season, playing the entire match in the 2–1 home loss to Monaco. On 27 September 2015, he scored in the 53rd minute to register his first competitive goal for Nice in a 4–1 Ligue 1 away win over Saint-Étienne.

Fulham
In July 2018, Seri joined Fulham on a four-year deal until 2022 with an option for Fulham to extend the contract by a further year.

Seri scored his first goal for his new club on 26 August, opening the scoring against Burnley with a spectacular strike from outside the area. Seri picked the ball up and took one touch around an oncoming defender before curling in a long-range effort into the top corner of Joe Hart's net and the goal was awarded with the Premier League Goal of the Month for August.

Loan to Galatasaray
On 18 July 2019, Seri joined Galatasaray on a season-long loan deal, with an option to buy. Eventually, he would leave Galatasaray and return to Fulham at the end of the season.

Loan to Bordeaux
On 30 January 2021, Seri joined Ligue 1 club Bordeaux on loan until the end of the season.

Return to Fulham
Following his return from his loan spell at Bordeaux, Seri began playing again for Fulham starting his first match for the club for the season against Huddersfield Town, which saw Fulham win 5–1 in the Championship on 14 August 2021. On 2 May 2022, Seri both featured and scored in a 7–0 victory over Luton Town, this victory securing the Championship title for Fulham. Despite promotion back to the Premier League, it was announced that Seri would be leaving the club at the end of his contract in June 2022.

Hull City
On 8 July 2022, Seri returned to the Championship to join Hull City on a three-year contract. Seri made his debut on 30 July 2022 in the home match against Bristol City and scored the winning goal in extra time.

International career
Seri made a total of three appearances for the Ivory Coast under-23 team, all of them at the 2011 CAF U-23 Championship held in Morocco, playing every minute of all their three Group B matches against South Africa, Egypt and Gabon. Ivory Coast finished third in Group B and thus did not qualify for the semifinals.

On 27 February 2014, Seri received his first senior international call up for the Ivory Coast in an upcoming friendly match against Belgium; he was an unused substitute in The Elephants 2–2 away draw (held on 5 March 2014) against Belgium. On 6 September 2015, Seri made his senior international debut in a 2017 Africa Cup of Nations qualification match against Sierra Leone, playing the entire match in the 0–0 away draw. Seri played two of Ivory Coast's three 2017 Africa Cup of Nations Group C matches. They finished third in Group C and thus did not qualify for the quarterfinals. On 17 November 2015, Seri scored a goal in the 64th minute of the 2018 FIFA World Cup qualification second round second leg 3–0 home win over Liberia to register his first senior international goal.

Personal life
Seri is a devout Christian.

Career statistics
Club

International

Scores and results list Ivory Coast's goal tally first.

HonoursGalatasarayTurkish Super Cup: 2019FulhamEFL Championship: 2021–22Individual'
UNFP Ligue 1 Team of the Year: 2016–17
Prix Marc-Vivien Foé: 2017
OGC Nice Player of the Year: 2017
Premier League Goal of the Month: August 2018

References

External links

 
 

1991 births
Living people
People from Bas-Sassandra District
Ivorian footballers
Ivory Coast international footballers
Association football midfielders
ASEC Mimosas players
FC Porto B players
F.C. Paços de Ferreira players
OGC Nice players
Fulham F.C. players
Galatasaray S.K. footballers
FC Girondins de Bordeaux players
Hull City A.F.C. players
Primeira Liga players
Liga Portugal 2 players
Ligue 1 players
Premier League players
Süper Lig players
2017 Africa Cup of Nations players
2019 Africa Cup of Nations players
2021 Africa Cup of Nations players
Ivorian expatriate footballers
Expatriate footballers in England
Expatriate footballers in France
Expatriate footballers in Portugal
Ivorian expatriate sportspeople in England
Ivorian expatriate sportspeople in France
Ivorian expatriate sportspeople in Portugal
Ivorian Christians